Askar Al-Enezi (born 1971) is a former Kuwaiti politician, representing the fourth district.  He was elected to the National Assembly in 2008.  The tenth representative from the fifth district was originally Mubarak Al-Mutairi.  However, on September 22, 2008, following a vote recount, the constitutional court repealed Al-Mutairi's seat and gave it to Al-Enezi.

References

1971 births
Living people
Members of the National Assembly (Kuwait)